The Ward LaFrance Truck Corporation was an American manufacturer of trucks and fire apparatus founded by Addison Ward LaFrance in 1916 in Elmira Heights, NY. The company ceased operations in 1979.

LaFrance was a relative of Truckson LaFrance, the founder of the similarly named fire apparatus manufacturer American LaFrance. and had worked at the legendary apparatus builder before beginning to build his own trucks and apparatus.

Ward LaFrance built tank wreckers for the US military, vans for United Parcel Service, over the road tractors, cement trucks, dump trucks, chassis for buses and trolleys, and armored cars.

Perhaps the best known Ward LaFrance product was the P-80 "Ambassador" model of pumper, one of which was donated as product placement by the company to be used as the fictional Los Angeles County Fire Department Engine 51 on the 1970s television program Emergency!. In 1976 the ailing company was purchased by a group of private investors but closed for good in 1979.

See also

 G-numbers (G116)

References

External links
 wardlafrance.com (Official)

Emergency services equipment makers